

Oskar Eckholt (4 November 1894 – 12 August 1982) was a German general (Generalmajor) in the Wehrmacht during World War II. He was a recipient of the Knight's Cross of the Iron Cross of Nazi Germany. Eckholt surrendered to American troops in May 1945. He was released in 1947.

Awards and decorations

 German Cross in Gold on 18 May 1942 as Oberstleutnant in Artillerie-Regiment 178
 Knight's Cross of the Iron Cross on 9 April 1943 as Oberst and commander of Artillerie-Regiment 178

References

Citations

Bibliography

 
 

1894 births
1982 deaths
Military personnel from Essen
Major generals of the German Army (Wehrmacht)
German Army personnel of World War I
Recipients of the clasp to the Iron Cross, 1st class
Recipients of the Gold German Cross
Recipients of the Knight's Cross of the Iron Cross
German prisoners of war in World War II held by the United States
People from the Rhine Province